Manoj Bhargava (born 1953) is an Indian American billionaire businessman and philanthropist. He is the founder and CEO of Innovations Ventures LLC (dba Living Essentials LLC), the company known for producing the 5-hour Energy drink. By 2012 the brand had grown to do an estimated $1 billion in sales. In 2015, Bhargava pledged 99% of his net worth to improving the well-being of the world's less fortunate.

Early life and education 
Bhargava was born in Lucknow, India in 1953, and in 1967, moved with his family to Philadelphia, Pennsylvania, United States. Bhargava's father attended the Wharton School of Business in pursuit of a doctorate degree. Bhargava won a math scholarship to an "elite private academy" called The Hill School, and after high school graduation attended Princeton University for one year in 1972.

Career 
After college, Bhargava returned to India and spent the next 12 years traveling to and from monasteries owned by the Hanslok Ashram. During this period, Bhargava moved back and forth between the US and India and worked a variety of middle-class office and construction jobs.

Bhargava returned to the US and joined his parents' plastic injection manufacturing company, Bhar Incorporated, located in New Haven, Indiana. In 1990 he purchased a company that produced parts for outdoor furniture. He sold Prime PVC Inc. in 2006. A subsequent company, Chemicalpartners.com, specialized in inventions and new ideas for business.

Bhargava created Innovations Ventures LLC (dba Living Essentials LLC), and launched 5-hour Energy in 2003. By 2012, retail sales had grown to an estimated $1 billion. Over time, Bhargava created additional entities or funds to support a variety of new ventures. These included the capital venture company MicroDose Life Sciences, a manufacturing venture laboratory called Stage 2 Innovations LLC, a private equity fund called ETC Capital LLC, Plymouth Real Estate Holdings LLC and Oakland Energy and Water Ventures. In 2014, he financed a New York City-based film distribution company, Bleecker Street.

Bhargava was interviewed on the ABC News show Nightline in September 2012. That year, an article in Forbes magazine said Bhargava and his company, Innovations Ventures, had participated in up to 90 court cases against competitors, suppliers and associates since 2003. As of 2012, fourteen of those cases had been settled or dismissed.

In 2013, Forbes reported Bhargava's net worth to be $1.5 billion, but he was dropped from its list of billionaires in 2014. Bhargava's 2015 documentary, Billions in Change, reports he has a net worth of over $4 billion, while some news articles report the $4 billion figure to be unverified.

Bhargava is a member of the Giving Pledge campaign. In 2015, he pledged to give 99% of his wealth to philanthropic causes. His foundations include the Hans Foundation and Rural India Supporting Trust. In 2016, Bhargava told National Geographic that he planned to distribute 10,000 of his stationary, power-generating bikes to rural homes and villages in India.

In January 2022, Bhargava purchased 90% of Freelancer Television Broadcasting, including television network NewsNet and television stations WMNN-LD and WXII-LD through his company MBX Wyoming Inc.

Personal life 
Bhargava is married, with one child, and lives in Farmington Hills, Michigan, US.

References

External links 
 NDTV interview
 Bhargava's Billions in Change documentary
 Bhargava and his Giving Pledge

Living people
1953 births
American people of Indian descent
American philanthropists
Giving Pledgers
21st-century philanthropists
Indian emigrants to the United States
Businesspeople from Lucknow
Indian philanthropists
Princeton University alumni
The Hill School alumni
American billionaires
Indian billionaires
21st-century American businesspeople